The Hanriot HD.8 was a short-lived French fighter prototype of the 1910s.

Development
A single-seat fighter, it was largely designed to test the experimental Le Rhône 9R engine. It first flew in early 1918, however was plagued by problems from the start, mainly due to its powerplant. As a result, it was never submitted for official testing. The data below are based on Hanriot estimates.

Specifications

References

 

1910s French fighter aircraft
Hanriot aircraft
Rotary-engined aircraft
Aircraft first flown in 1918